Sindhi Camp is the inter-state bus terminal of Jaipur city in India. It is located along Station Road in Jaipur. It is Central Bus stand for Rajasthan State Road Transport Corporation (RSRTC). Buses are available for Rajasthan, Delhi, Haryana, Uttar Pradesh, Uttarakhand, Gujarat and various other locations.

References 

Transport in Jaipur
Bus stations in Rajasthan
Neighbourhoods in Jaipur
Buildings and structures in Jaipur